This is a list of Japanese football transfers in the summer transfer window 2017 by club.

J1 League

Urawa Red Diamonds 

In:

Out:

Kawasaki Frontale 

In:

Out:

Kashima Antlers 

In:

Out:

Gamba Osaka

In:

Out:

Omiya Ardija

In:

Out:

Sanfrecce Hiroshima

In:

Out:

Vissel Kobe

In:

Out:

Kashiwa Reysol

 
In:

 

Out:

Yokohama F. Marinos

In:

Out:

FC Tokyo

In:

 

 

Out:

Sagan Tosu

In:

 
 
 
 

Out:

Vegalta Sendai

In:

 

Out:

Júbilo Iwata

In:

Out:

Ventforet Kofu

In:

 

Out:

Albirex Niigata

In:

 

 

Out:

Hokkaido Consadole Sapporo

In:

 

 

Out:

Shimizu S-Pulse

In:

Out:

Cerezo Osaka

In:

Out:

J2 League

Nagoya Grampus

In:

 
 

Out:

Shonan Bellmare

In:

Out:

Avispa Fukuoka

In:

Out:

Matsumoto Yamaga

In:

Out:

Kyoto Sanga FC

In:

Out:

Fagiano Okayama

In:

Out:

Machida Zelvia

In:

Out:

Yokohama FC

In:

Out:

Tokushima Vortis

In:

Out:

Ehime FC

In:

 

Out:

JEF United Chiba

In:

Out:

Renofa Yamaguchi

In:

Out:

Mito HollyHock

In:

Out:

Montedio Yamagata

In:

 
 

Out:

V-Varen Nagasaki

In:

Out:

Roasso Kumamoto

In:

Out:

Thespakusatsu Gunma

In:

Out:

Tokyo Verdy

In:

Out:

Kamatamare Sanuki

In:

 

Out:

FC Gifu

In:

 

Out:

Zweigen Kanazawa

In:

Out:

Oita Trinita

In:

Out:

J3 League

Giravanz Kitakyushu

In:

Out:

Tochigi SC

In:

Out:

Nagano Parceiro

In:

Out:

Blaublitz Akita

In:

Out:

Kagoshima United F.C.

In:

Out:

Kataller Toyama

In:

Out:

Fujieda MYFC

In:

Out:

F.C. Ryukyu

In:

Out:

S.C. Sagamihara

In:

Out:

Grulla Morioka

In:

Out:

Fukushima United F.C.

In:

Out:

Gainare Tottori

In:

Out:

YSCC Yokohama

In:

Out:

Azul Claro Numazu

In:

Out:

References 

2017
Transfers
Japan